Simnialena is a genus of sea snails, marine gastropod mollusks in the family Ovulidae.

Species
Species within the genus Simnialena include:
Simnialena acuminata (Sowerby in A. Adams & Reeve, 1848)
Simnialena ilhabelaensis Fehse, 2001
Simnialena marferula Cate, 1973
Simnialena rufa (Sowerby, 1832)
Simnialena uniplicata (Sowerby, 1849)

References

Ovulidae